HMS Scourge was a  designed by Sir William Symonds, Surveyor of the Navy. She was initially commissioned for service with the Channel Squadron before moving to the North America and West Indies Station. She then served in the Mediterranean 
then the west coast of Africa. Her final service was in the Mediterranean. She was broken in 1865.

Scourge was the sixth named vessel since it was used for a 14-gun brig-sloop, launched by Allin of Dover on 26 October 1779, purchased on the stocks and foundered off the Dutch coast on 7 November 1795.

Construction
She was ordered on 18 March 1841 from Portsmouth Dockyard though her keel was not laid until February 1844. She was launched on 9 November 1844. Following her launch she was towed to the East India Docks to have her boilers and machinery fitted. She was then towed back to Portsmouth and was completed for sea on 13 May 1846 at an initial cost of £55,002 including the hull at £21,328, machinery at £20,390 and fitting at £13,284.

Commissioned Service

First Commission
She was commissioned on 26 November 1845 under Commander Jamea Crawford Caffin, RN for service with the Channel Squadron at Portsmouth. The 13-inch mortar was removed while with the Channel Squadron. On 1 October 1847 Commander Henry Edward Wingrove, RN took command for service on the North America and West Indies Station.Then in October 1849 Commander Lord Frederick Herbert Kerr, RN took command for service in the Mediterranean. She returned to Home Waters and paid off on 27 November 1852. While in steam reserve her armament was increased to six guns

Second Commission
She was commissioned in April 1854 under Commander John Adams, RN for the West Coast of Africa as Flag Ship of the Squadron. She return to pay off on 28 November 1857.

Third Commission
She was commissioned for the last time on 28 June 1858 under Commander H.S.H. Prince Victor of Hohenlobe-Langenberg for service in the Mediterranean. Commander William Gore Jones, RN took command on 13 December 1859. She returned and paid off on 8 February 1862.

Disposition
She was broken in 1865.

Notes

Citations

References
 Lyon Winfield, The Sail & Steam Navy List, All the Ships of the Royal Navy 1815 to 1889, by David Lyon & Rif Winfield, published by Chatham Publishing, London © 2004, 
 Winfield, British Warships in the Age of Sail (1817 – 1863), by Rif Winfield, published by Seaforth Publishing, England © 2014, e, Chapter 11 Steam Paddle Vessels, Vessels acquired since November 1830, Stromboli Class
 Colledge, Ships of the Royal Navy, by J.J. Colledge, revised and updated by Lt Cdr Ben Warlow and Steve Bush, published by Seaforth Publishing, Barnsley, Great Britain, © 2020, e  (EPUB)
 The New Navy List, conducted by Joseph Allen, Esq., RN, London: Parker, Furnivall, and Parker, Military Library, Whitehall, MDCCCXLVII
 The Navy List, published by His Majesty's Stationery Office, London

Paddle sloops of the Royal Navy
Sloop classes